Stipagrostis is a genus of African, Asian, and Russian plants in the grass family.

 Species

References

Poaceae genera
Grasses of Africa
Grasses of Asia
Grasses of Europe
Grasses of Russia
Taxa named by Christian Gottfried Daniel Nees von Esenbeck
Aristidoideae